Codiaceae is a family of green algae in the order Bryopsidales.

Genera 
 † Abacella Maslov 
 Appeninocodium O.Dragastan 
 Arabicodium G.F.Elliott 
 Bevocastria E.J.Garwood 
 Botryella V.P.Shuysky
 Boueina F.Toula 
 Codium Stackhouse 
 Garwoodia Alan Wood 
 Geppella Børgesen  
 Hedstroemia A.Rothpletz 
 Ivanovia Khvorova
 Johnsonicodium O.Dragastan 
 Neoanchicodium R.Endô
 Scotlandella O.Dragastan 
 Succodium Konishi  
 Tethysicodium  O.Dragastan

Synonyms:
 Acanthocodium
 Agardhia A.Cabrera, 1823, nom. illeg., currently regarded as a synonym of Codium.
 Lamarckia Olivi, 1792, nom. rejic., currently regarded as a synonym of Codium.
 Moniliaxes  Kajimura, 1977, Taxonomic status: uncertain, requiring further investigation.
 Spongodium  J.V.F.Lamouroux, 1813,  Taxonomic status: uncertain, requiring further investigation.

References

External links

 
Ulvophyceae families
Bryopsidales